Michel Michelet (July 14, 1894 – December 28, 1995) was a composer of film scores. Born as Mikhail Isaakovich Levin to a Jewish family in Kiev (then in the Russian Empire), he moved to Western Europe before settling in France where he became a celebrated composer. He worked on many films during the 1930s following the introduction of sound film. Following the Nazi invasion of France in 1940, he emigrated to the United States where he continued to work on Hollywood productions including several films noir. Later he provided scores for some European films in the post-war era.

He was nominated twice at the 17th Academy Awards for Best Original Score but did not win.

Selected filmography

 Nights of Princes (1930)
 Queen of the Night (1931)
 La Femme d'une nuit (1931)
 The Abbot Constantine (1933)
 The Faceless Voice (1933)
 The Scandal (1934)
 Les yeux noirs (1935)
 Compliments of Mister Flow (1936)
 The Volga Boatman (1936)
 Forty Little Mothers (1936)
 The Lie of Nina Petrovna (1937)
 The Cheat (1937)
 After Midnight (1938)
 Alert in the Mediterranean (1938)
 Nights of Princes (1938)
 La Brigade sauvage (1939)
 Serge Panine (1939)
 Personal Column (1939)
 Immediate Call (1939)
 Savage Brigade (1939)
 The Emigrant (1940)
 Miss Annie Rooney (1942)
 The Crime Doctor's Strangest Case  (1943)
 Up in Mabel's Room (1944)
 The Hairy Ape (1944)
 Voice in the Wind (1944)
 Music for Millions (1944)
 The Diary of a Chambermaid (1946)
 The Chase (1946)
 Lured (1947)
 Impact (1949)
 Outpost in Morocco (1949)
 The Man on the Eiffel Tower (1949)
 Siren of Atlantis (1949)
 Once a Thief (1950)
 M (1951)
 Tarzan and the Jungle Queen (1951)
 Fort Algiers (1953)
 The Body Beautiful (1953)
 The Beast from 20,000 Fathoms (1953) [Not used]
 A Missionary (1955)
 Desert Warrior (1957)
 The Tiger of Eschnapur (1959)
 The Indian Tomb (1959)
 Girl from Hong Kong (1961)
 A Queen for Caesar (1962)
 Captain Sindbad (1963)

References

Bibliography 
 Geoff Mayer & Brian McDonnell. Encyclopedia of Film Noir. ABC-CLIO, 2007.

External links 
 

1894 births
1995 deaths
French emigrants to the United States
Male film score composers
Film people from Kyiv
Ukrainian SSR emigrants to France
Ukrainian film score composers
Ukrainian Jews
Jews who emigrated to escape Nazism
20th-century male musicians